Thandla Assembly constituency is one of the 230 Vidhan Sabha (Legislative Assembly) constituencies of Madhya Pradesh state in central India. Thandla Assembly constituency is one of the three Assembly constituencies in Jhabua district.

See also
 Thandla

References

Assembly constituencies of Madhya Pradesh
Jhabua district